Kevin Perez (born April 20, 2003), known professionally as Kay Flock, is an American rapper. Hailing from the Bronx, he began his musical career in 2020, he rose to fame through a variety of singles, most notably "Shake It". He released his debut mixtape, The D.O.A. Tape, in 2021.

Early life 
Kevin Perez was born on April 20, 2003 in The Bronx, New York; he later described the area he grew up in as "dangerous". He is cousins with fellow NYC drill rapper Dthang Gz, named Daniel Collins. Perez‘s half brother is another fellow NYC drill rapper JoWvttz, named Johnny Hernandez. They share the same dad.

Career 
Kay Flock began his music career in May 2020, issuing his first single, "FTO"; other songs that he released following this included "Opp Spotter" (featuring B-Lovee), "Brotherly Love" (featuring B-Lovee and Dougie B) and "PSA".

Kay Flock released his debut mixtape, The D.O.A. Tape, on November 5, 2021, which peaked at number one on the Heatseekers Albums chart. In August, he released "Is Ya Ready"; the song was named within journalist Jon Caramanica's top 28 songs of 2021. He later released "Being Honest", which samples "Changes" by XXXTentacion. The song was said to be "reminiscent of G Herbo" and was named within Pitchforks top 38 rap songs of 2021 and top 100 songs of 2021. A remix of the song, featuring G Herbo, was released in November.

In October, he was featured on "Not in the Mood" by Lil Tjay, which also featured Fivio Foreign. The song peaked at number 61 on the Billboard Hot 100. In November, Kay Flock was named Billboards Hip Hop Rookie of the Month. During an interview with XXL, he stated that his style of rapping was compared to King Von and Pop Smoke, with Asian Doll saying that Von would have been a fan of Kay Flock.

In April 2022, Kay Flock released "Shake It" with Dougie B and Cardi B, featuring Bory300; it peaked at number 51 on the Billboard Hot 100. The track was leaked months prior, although the leaked version of the song featured Yonkers rapper Mula Gzz, whose verse was replaced with Cardi’s.

Legal issues 
On December 23, 2021, it was reported Perez was arrested after allegedly shooting and killing 24 year-old Oscar Hernandez, also known as OY Wasca and/or Honcho, in Harlem, New York. According to the New York Police Department, on December 16, 2021, as Perez walked past a barbershop near the scene of the crime, Hernandez ran out of the shop before allegedly being shot in the neck and back by Perez. Hernandez later died of his injuries at Mount Sinai Hospital. After Perez was named as the main suspect in the investigation, he turned himself into the NYPD on December 23. He is currently facing first-degree murder charges, indicted on federal murder, attempted murder, and racketeering charges in relation to the Sevside/DOA crew and was moved from Rikers Island to a federal prison pending trial. If found guilty on all charges, he faces mandatory life in prison or death.

Discography

Mixtapes

Singles

As lead artist

As featured artist

Notes

References 

2003 births
Living people
21st-century American rappers
African-American male rappers
Bloods
Capitol Records artists
Drill musicians
Rappers from the Bronx